Vit may refer to:

 Vit (river), a river in Bulgaria
 Vit Ice Piedmont (Vit Glacier), a glacier in Antarctica
 de Vit, European surname
 Vít, Czech given name
 vit., short for vitamin
 Vit (album), 2017 album by Christer Fredriksen
 "Vit" (song), a 1994 song by The Future Sound of London

See also
 VIT (disambiguation)
 Vitt (disambiguation)
 Vits (disambiguation)
 Vid (disambiguation)
 Veit (disambiguation)
 
 Saint-Vit (disambiguation)